Hydrophis gracilis, also known as the graceful small-headed seasnake, slender sea snake, narrow-headed sea snake, common small-headed sea snake, is a species of sea snake found in the Indian and Pacific Oceans. It is venomous.

Diagnostic characters
Head small, body long and slender anteriorly; scales on thickest part of body juxtaposed; 5–6 maxillary teeth behind fangs; 17–21 scale rows around neck, 30–36 around thickest part of body (increase from neck to midbody 18–24); ventrals divided by a longitudinal fissure; prefrontal in contact with third upper labial; ventrals 220–287.

Total length males 950 mm, females 1025 mm; tail length males 80 mm, females 95 mm.

Distribution
Hydrophis gracilis is found on the coasts of the Indian Ocean and West Pacific, from around the Persian Gulf (Bahrain, Qatar, Saudi Arabia, Oman, United Arab Emirates (UAE), Iran, Iraq and Kuwait) to Pakistan, India, Sri Lanka, Bangladesh, Myanmar, Thailand, and Indonesia, and into the Malay Archipelago/West Pacific in Thailand, Malaysia, Singapore, Cambodia, Vietnam, the Philippines, southern China, Hong Kong, and Taiwan, as well as in Australia (Queensland) and Papua New Guinea.

References

External links
 Microcephalphis gracilis at the Australian Faunal Directory

gracilis
Snakes of Asia
Reptiles of the Arabian Peninsula
Snakes of Australia
Reptiles of Bangladesh
Reptiles of Cambodia
Snakes of China
Reptiles of Hong Kong
Reptiles of Iran
Reptiles of Iraq
Snakes of India
Reptiles of Indonesia
Reptiles of Malaysia
Reptiles of Myanmar
Reptiles of Pakistan
Reptiles of Papua New Guinea
Reptiles of the Philippines
Reptiles of Singapore
Reptiles of Sri Lanka
Reptiles of Taiwan
Reptiles of Thailand
Snakes of Vietnam
Reptiles described in 1802
Taxa named by George Shaw
Reptiles of Borneo